NGC 6005 is an open cluster in the constellation Norma. It is 5875 light-years distant and thought to be around 1.15 billion years old.

References

NGC 6005
6005
Norma (constellation)